The 2020 Abkhazian Cup was the 26th edition of Abkhazian Cup organized by Football Federation of Abkhazia. The competition began on 8 September 2020 and ended in 1 November the same year.

Participating teams
This edition of the competition was attended by 8 teams: FC Afon, Sadz Tsandripsh, Yertsakhu Ochamchira, Samurzakan Gal, FC Gagra, Dynamo Sukhum, Nart Sukhum  and Ritsa FC.

The Abkhazia Cup champion team qualifies for the Abkhazia Super Cup final and face the Abkhazian Premier League champion team.

The final of the Abkhazia Cup took place on November 1, 2020.
The two teams qualified for the grand final match were FC Gagra and Ritsa FC.

FC Gagra's team won by the score of 2x1 and became champion of the Abkhazia Cup 2020. With this victory, the club already has six Abkhazia Cup trophies.

Games by stage

Stage 1

First Match

Second Match

Stage 2 (Semi-finals)

Final

References

Football in Abkhazia